The 1986 Spanish Grand Prix was a Formula One motor race held at Jerez on 13 April 1986. This was the first Formula One Spanish Grand Prix since the 1981 race was held at Jarama.

This race featured a 3 car battle for the lead over the last half of the race. Ayrton Senna (Lotus-Renault), Nigel Mansell (Williams-Honda) and reigning World Champion Alain Prost (McLaren-TAG) all had opportunities to take the win, with close nose to tail racing around the circuit. Once Mansell pitted for fresh tyres he charged back into the fight making up over 19 seconds in the final 10 laps on his fresh rubber. It was not quite sufficient to take the win, but it was very close with Senna and Mansell taking the chequered flag almost side by side, Senna only 0.014 s in front of Mansell in one of the closest finishes in Formula One history. This was the third-closest finish in Formula One history, after Mansell's spectacular charge allowed him to pull alongside Senna on the final straight.

In an interview after the race, Mansell said he had no problems with Senna's defensive driving (blocking) at the end of the race when the Williams was clearly the quicker car, saying that Senna was entitled to protect his lead. He then jokingly added that the finish was so close they should give them both 7 points each (which is the average between the winner's 9 points and second place's 6).

Classification

Qualifying

Race

Championship standings after the race

Drivers' Championship standings

Constructors' Championship standings

 Note: Only the top five positions are included for both sets of standings.

References

Spanish Grand Prix
Grand Prix
Spanish Grand Prix